Episomus is a genus of beetles belonging to the family Curculionidae. Species are distributed throughout Sri Lanka, India, Myanmar, Thailand, Malay Peninsula, Sumatra, Java, Borneo, Philippines, China and Japan. Many species are considered economically important, as they are pests of field beans, cotton and pigeon pea.

Description
Body variable in size and shape generally elongate, broad, and ovate. Vestiture varies from brown or metallic green. Some species are greenish or black. Three kind of scales are present: the predominant usually oval and the less predominant ones more elongate or plumose. Dorsum of many species is brown. Head with a central furrow and a more or less distinct transverse impression behind the eye. Eyes are convex, lateral, prominent, and very short ovate. Scrobes are very deep in front, but shallower near the eyes. Rostrum broader than the forehead. Mandibles obtuse, prominent and with a strongly marked scar. Antennae with scape exceeding the hind margin of the eye. Antennae geniculate and consist of a scape, a seven segmented funicle.

Prothorax usually with strong transverse plications and a more or less distinct central furrow. Prothorax base is either bisinuate or subtruncate. Scutellum variable, and usually well developed. Elytra not soldered together and with or without a distinct humeral angle. Elytral base slightly covering the basal margin of the prothorax. Legs stout, and elongate with unarmed femora. Epistome forming a sharp acute angle behind. Sternum with the fore coxae nearer the anterior margin of the prosternum. Ventrum varied with light brown, grey with white, black or metallic green.

Species
 Episomus aemulus Faust, 1897 - Malaysia
 Episomus albarius Faust, 1897 - Indonesia
 Episomus andrewesi Marshall, 1916 - India
 Episomus apicalis Chevrolat, 1883 - Malaysia
 Episomus appendiculatus Faust, 1897 - India, China, Malaysia
 Episomus arcuatus Marshall, 1916 - India
 Episomus arduus Marshall, 1916 - India
 Episomus arrogans Boheman, 1842 - India, Myanmar
 Episomus avuncularius Marshall, 1916 - India
 Episomus bicuspis Marshall, 1916 - Myanmar
 Episomus bilineatus Chevrolat, 1883 - Malaysia, Singapore
 Episomus binodosus Chevrolat, 1883 - Malaysia
 Episomus brevipennis Faust, 1897 - Myanmar
 Episomus castelnaui Faust, 1897 - Malaysia
 Episomus celebensis Faust, 1895 - Indonesia
 Episomus chlorostigma (Wiedemann, 1819) - Indonesia
 Episomus cochinchinensis Faust, 1897 - Vietnam
 Episomus connexus Marshall, 1916 - Myanmar
 Episomus decipiens Marshall, 1916 - India
 Episomus dejeani Faust, 1897 - India
 Episomus distans Faust, 1897 - Indonesia
 Episomus distinguendus Faust, 1897 - Indonesia
 Episomus diutinus Faust, 1897 - Indonesia
 Episomus dohertyi Marshall, 1916 - India
 Episomus dorsalis Faust, 1897 - Indonesia
 Episomus exaratus Faust, 1897 - Indonesia
 Episomus fabriciusi Faust, 1897 - India
 Episomus fausti Hartmann, 1900 - Indonesia
 Episomus figulus Boheman, 1834 - India, Indonesia
 Episomus figuratus Karsch, 1882 - Sri Lanka
 Episomus fimbriatus Pascoe, 1871 - Malaysia, Sri Lanka, Indonesia
 Episomus fortius Voss, 1937 - China
 Episomus frenatus Marshall, 1916 - India
 Episomus freyi Zumpt, 1937 - China
 Episomus gracilicornis Ritsema, 1882 - Indonesia
 Episomus gryphus Faust, 1897 - Indonesia
 Episomus guttatus Boheman, 1845 - India, Myanmar, Malaysia
 Episomus gyllenhali Faust, 1897 - Indonesia
 Episomus humeralis Chevrolat, 1883 - Indonesia, Bangladesh, India
 Episomus iconicus Pascoe, 1871 - Cambodia
 Episomus illustris Faust, 1897 - Malaysia, Singapore
 Episomus incisipes Chevrolat, 1883 - Malaysia
 Episomus incomptus Faust, 1897 - Philippines
 Episomus inermicollis Marshall, 1916 - India
 Episomus intercalaris Faust, 1897 - Indonesia
 Episomus irregularis Marshall, 1916 - India
 Episomus kraatzi Faust, 1895 - Malaysia, Indonesia
 Episomus kwanhsiensis Heller, 1923 - China
 Episomus lacerta (Fabricius, 1781) - Indonesia, India
 Episomus laticollis Pascoe, 1887 - Thailand
 Episomus lentus Erichson, 1834 - Philippines
 Episomus limbaticollis Marshall, 1916 - Myanmar
 Episomus lucidus Hartmann, 1900 - Indonesia
 Episomus malaccensis Faust, 1897 - Malaysia
 Episomus manipurensis Marshall, 1916 - India
 Episomus marshalli Heller, 1908 - Vietnam
 Episomus montanus Guerin, 1843 - India
 Episomus mori Kono, 1928 - Japan
 Episomus mundus Sharp, 1896 - Japan
 Episomus nebulosus Marshall, 1916 - India
 Episomus nigropustulatus Faust, 1894 - Myanmar
 Episomus nilgirinus Heller, 1908 - India
 Episomus nobilis Faust, 1895 - Malaysia, Indonesia
 Episomus obesulus (Faust, 1897) - Cambodia
 Episomus obliquus Marshall, 1916 - Myanmar
 Episomus oblongus Marshall, 1916 - Myanmar
 Episomus obstrusus Marshall, 1916 - Myanmar
 Episomus obuncus Marshall, 1916 - India
 Episomus omisiensis Heller, 1923 - China
 Episomus parallelus Chevrolat, 1883 - Vietnam
 Episomus pauperatus (Fabricius, 1801) - Indonesia, Malaysia
 Episomus platina (Sparrmann, 1785) - Indonesia, Vietnam
 Episomus praecanus Faust, 1897 - Indonesia
 Episomus profanus Faust, 1894 - Myanmar
 Episomus pudibundus Faust, 1894 - Myanmar
 Episomus pudicus Faust, 1897 - Malaysia, Indonesia
 Episomus pyriformis Marshall, 1916 - Sri Lanka
 Episomus quadrimaculatus Marshall, 1916 - India
 Episomus quatuornotatus Desbrochers des Loges, 1890 - India
 Episomus raucus Faust, 1897 - India
 Episomus repandus Faust, 1894 - Myanmar, Cambodia
 Episomus sagax Faust, 1897 - India, Bangladesh
 Episomus saitus Faust, 1897 - Indonesia
 Episomus sennae Faust, 1894 - Myanmar
 Episomus siamensis Faust, 1897 - Malaysia, Cambodia, Thailand
 Episomus simulator Faust, 1897 - Indonesia, Malaysia
 Episomus singularis Faust, 1897 - Thailand
 Episomus sobrinus Faust, 1897 - Malaysia
 Episomus stellio Snellen Van Vollenhoven, 1864 - Indonesia
 Episomus suavis Faust, 1897 - Malaysia
 Episomus subnitens Marshall, 1916 - Indonesia, Myanmar
 Episomus subtuberculatus Heller, 1922 - Vietnam
 Episomus sulcicollis (Pascoe, 1865) - Myanmar
 Episomus takahashi Kono, 1928 - Taiwan
 Episomus timidus Faust, 1897 - Malaysia, Indonesia
 Episomus tristiculus Voss, 1958 - Taiwan
 Episomus truncatirostris (Fairmaire, 1889) - China
 Episomus turritus (Gyllenhal, 1833) - Japan, China, Korea
 Episomus uncatus Faust, 1897 - Malaysia, Indonesia
 Episomus uniformis Pascoe, 1887 - India
 Episomus versutus Faust, 1895 - Myanmar, India
 Episomus vethi Hartmann, 1914 - Indonesia
 Episomus viriosus Faust, 1897 - Indonesia
 Episomus watanabei Kono, 1932 - Taiwan
 Episomus wiedemanni Faust, 1897 - Indonesia
 Episomus yunnanensis Voss, 1937 - China

References

Curculionidae
Curculionidae genera